Sabie is a forestry town situated on the banks of the Sabie River in Mpumalanga, South Africa. The name Sabie is derived from the siSwati word "Ulusaba" which means "fearful river" because the river was once teeming with dangerous Nile crocodile. The word Ulusaba was modernized by the Afrikaner settlers who changed it from Ulusaba (siSwati) into the Afrikaans "Sabie"   .

The town was started after H.T. Glynn and J.C. Ingle found gold there and formed the Glynns-Lydenburg Gold Mining Company.

Sabie is located 360 kilometres east of Johannesburg and 64 kilometres west of the popular Kruger National Park. It is known for its scenery and beautiful waterfalls, and is a popular tourist destination.

Its main industry is forestry. The plantations surrounding Sabie form one of the world's largest man-made forests.

During the winter period, there is little rainfall, and the area can become intensely dry. Forest fires are prevalent during this time, therefore precautions are taken beforehand to create fire breaks, as well as to incorporate block burning

Sabie is also a tourism based town and relies on the steady flow of tourists year round to keep the community economy going. There are many attractions in and around the town itself. Of these the most popular is the Lone Creek Falls about  outside of town. There are many other waterfalls in the area, such as the Bridal Veil, Maria Shire, Horseshoe, Forest Falls, and the Sabie River falls situated within the town itself.

Tourism
A large portion of the tourism is taken up by the adventurous mountain bikers that make their way to the downhill slaloms in the pine forests. One of these is the Noon to Moon which is a 10-hour endurance relay race for teams of 3. Teams complete as many laps as possible around a  course of single track. The start is at 12 noon from the Castle Rock Camp site in Sabie and includes 3 hours of night riding. There are many kilometres of flowing single tracks which make this town a must to visit for mountain bikers.

There is also excellent trout fly fishing in the Sabie River which is regularly stocked. Permits are required to fish.

Sabie boasts its own brewery located on 45 Main road, The Sabie Brewing Company produce 6 hand-crafted beers all true to their style.

Protests
In February 2016, tourists and the residents of Sabie were prevented from leaving the town near Kruger Park when protesters barricaded all exit roads.
Sabie police spokesman Constable Mandy Mculu said the protesters began barricading the roads early in the morning.

"They were protesting because electricity had been cut to an illegal settlement the day before," she explained. About 500 people were involved in the protest.

References

External links
Sabie website
Waterval SC Guest House

Populated places in the Thaba Chweu Local Municipality